Heights of Abraham may refer to:

 Heights of Abraham, Derbyshire, England
 Heights of Abraham, also known as the Plains of Abraham, Quebec, Canada
 The Heights of Abraham, British electronic music group